Briula or Brioula was an ancient city and bishopric of ancient Lydia or of Caria in Asia Minor, which remains a Latin Catholic titular see.

Its site is located near Billara in Asiatic Turkey.

History 
The city was important enough in the Late Roman province of Asia Prima to be one of the suffragans of its great capital Ephesus's Metropolitan Archbishopric. However, like most, it was to fade.

Titular see 
The diocese was nominally restored in as Latin Catholic titular bishopric.

It has had the following incumbents, all of the fitting episcopal (lowest) rank :
  Kyril Stefan Kurteff (1926.07.31 – 1971.03.09), twice Apostolic Exarch of Sofia of the Bulgarians (Bulgaria) (1926.07.31 – 1942 and 1951.04.27 – death 1971.03.09)
 Christo Proykov (1993.12.18 – ...), Apostolic Exarch of above Sofia of the Bulgarians (Bulgaria) (1995.09.05 – ...), President of Episcopal Conference of Bulgaria

See also 
 Catholic Church in Turkey

References

External links 
 GCatholic with titular incumbent bio links

Catholic titular sees in Asia
Populated places in ancient Caria
Populated places in ancient Lydia
Former populated places in Turkey
Roman towns and cities in Turkey
History of Aydın Province
Kuyucak District